Reigning Still was an arena concert by Filipina entertainer Regine Velasquez. The concert was announced in October 2004 and held on two consecutive nights in December at the Araneta Coliseum in Quezon City as a part of Velasquez's campaign to support her twelfth studio album, Covers, Vol. 1 (2004). The set list featured songs predominantly taken from the album, and various covers of pop hits. It was exclusively promoted by GMA Network, with Smart Communications as sponsor. Velasquez served as the stage and creative director for the show, which featured Andrew E., Sarah Geronimo, Sheryn Regis, Kyla, Francis Magalona, and Ariel Rivera as guest acts. Velasquez was nominated for Best Female Major Concert Act at the 18th Aliw Awards for the production.

Background and development
Regine Velasquez released her twelfth studio album Covers, Vol. 1 in October 2004. The cover album contains remakes of popular Filipino music (OPM) recorded by male artists, and was issued with a bonus Video CD (VCD) of four music videos for its tracks, including Ariel Rivera's "Minsan Lang Kitang Iibigin" and Martin Nievera's "Say That You Love Me". The album was a commercial success, selling over 30,000 copies a week after its release and earning a platinum certification from the Philippine Association of the Record Industry (PARI). As part of the album's promotion, Velasquez performed in small venue tours, which included the SM North EDSA and The Podium. In the same month, it was announced that Velasquez would perform a headlining concert on December 3–4, 2004, at the Araneta Coliseum with a show title called Reigning Still.

According to the Philippine Daily Inquirers Pablo Tariman, Velasquez had a say in every aspect of the two-night show, which she envisioned to be her "most spectacular ever". Similar to her previous arena concert in 2000, R2K: The Concert, Velasquez served as stage and creative director, while Raul Mitra was chosen as musical director. During rehearsals and preparations for the show, she revealed her uncertainty staging an arena concert for its physical demands and cost. She further said, "This one might be my last... And more importantly, if people would still want to see me in a concert like [this] four years from now". The show was a joint production by GMA Network and Aria Productions, with Smart Communications as sponsor. Velasquez and her team selected Andrew E., Sarah Geronimo, Sheryn Regis, Kyla, Francis Magalona, and Ariel Rivera as special guests.

Synopsis and recordings
The concert opened with a masquerade ball as Velasquez, wearing a Victorian era costume, appeared onstage with her background dancers while performing an uptempo version of Barry Manilow's "Could It Be Magic". She was joined by a caped magician performing tricks and illusions, before leaving offstage. The magician exited doing a vanishing act, and made Velasquez re-appear onstage as she began singing Britney Spears's "Toxic" while dancing. After a costume change, she performed "Di Bale Na Lang" with Andrew E. She closed the segment with Ariel Rivera's "Minsan Lang Kitang Iibigin".

The setlist continued with Velasquez's renditions of her singing competition songs, George Benson's "In Your Eyes" and Jennifer Holliday's "And I Am Telling You I'm Not Going". For the latter performance, she was joined by Sarah Geronimo, Sheryn Regis, and Kyla. This was followed by "Say That You Love Me". She then sang a duet of "Tell Me" with Rivera, before continuing with "Kailan". The next segment was a medley of "The Reason", "Bring Me to Life", and "In the End" with Francis Magalona. During the performance of "My Miracle", "I Believe I Can Fly", and "I Believe", Velasquez was accompanied by The San Miguel Chorale. For the final act, Velasquez performed a medley of Michael Jackson's hits. After the song ended, she thanked the audience before exiting the stage. Velasquez returned onstage for an encore performance of "Shine".

The concert was aired as a television special on GMA Network in 2005. Velasquez received a nomination for Best Female Major Concert Act at the 18th Aliw Awards for the production.

Set list
This set list is adapted from the television special Reigning Still.

 "Could It Be Magic"
 "Toxic"
 "Di Bale Na Lang" 
 "Minsan Lang Kitang Iibigin"
 "In Your Eyes"
 "And I Am Telling You I'm Not Going" 
 "Say That You Love Me"
 "Tell Me" 
 "Kailan"
 "The Reason" / "Bring Me to Life" / "In the End" 
 "Kailangan Ko'y Ikaw"
 "My Miracle" / "I Believe I Can Fly" / "I Believe"
 "Billie Jean" / "Bad" / "Beat It" / "Thriller"
Encore
 "Shine"

Personnel
Credits and personnel are adapted from the television special Reigning Still.

Show

Regine Velasquezshow direction, staging
Raul Mitramusical director
Noel Cabacungantelevision director
Maro Garciaassistant director
Buboy Favorfloor director
Rajo Laurelcostume design
Pepsi Herreracostume design
Liza Camusproduction manager
Maribel Garciaassistant production manager
John Batallalighting
Rene Cruzsound engineer

Band

The San Miguel Master Chorale
Raul Mitrakeyboards
Sony Matiaskeyboards
Bobby Rascoguitars
Cesar Aguasguitars
Tek Faustinodrums
Niño Regaladopercussion
Babsie Molinabackground vocalist
Sylvia Macaraegbackground vocalist
Rene Martinezbackground vocalist
Roy del Vallebackground vocalist
Lisa del Vallebackground vocalist

Dancers

Nancy Crowe
Des Guico
Joyce Regala
Joie Tinsay
Kristine Averia
Shiela Lacro
Ida Ramos
Charles Thompson
Angel Sy
Richard Argulla
James Valdez
Julius Obregon
Nick Tala

Executive producers
GMA Network
Aria Productions

See also
 List of Regine Velasquez live performances

Notes

References

External links
 Tours of Regine Velasquez at Live Nation

Regine Velasquez concert tours